Torrey Joël DeVitto (born June 8, 1984) is an American actress and former fashion model. Her first starring role was as Karen Kerr on the ABC Family drama series Beautiful People (2005–2006). She followed this up with recurring roles as Carrie in The CW drama series One Tree Hill (2008–2009), as Melissa Hastings in the ABC Family/Freeform mystery drama series Pretty Little Liars (2010–2017), and as Dr. Meredith Fell in The CW fantasy drama series The Vampire Diaries (2012–2013). DeVitto went on to star as Maggie Hall in the final season of Lifetime's drama series Army Wives (2013) and as Dr. Natalie Manning in the NBC medical drama series Chicago Med (2015–2021).

Early life 
Torrey Joel DeVitto was born and raised in Huntington on Long Island, New York and Winter Park, Florida. Her parents are Mary and Liberty DeVitto; her father was a long-time drummer for Billy Joel. They met in 1983. DeVitto is of Italian descent, her paternal grandmother is from Naples while her paternal grandfather is from Sicily.

As a child, DeVitto spent a lot of time touring with her parents. She described her childhood to CVLUX magazine by saying: "We spent every Thanksgiving at Billy Joel's house. I grew up with his daughter, Alexa; it was a lot of warm, happy memories." Her mother Mary had been Stevie Nicks's best friend since the late 1970s and met Liberty when he was the drummer on Stevie's Wild Heart Tour. On the day of her birth, Joel was performing at the Wembley Arena and made a special note before beginning "The Longest Time" that DeVitto's wife was having a baby, causing a standing ovation for DeVitto, who was playing the drums at the concert. She was named Torrey after her mother's maiden name. She has two sisters, Devon and Maryelle. Her sister Maryelle was in the TV series Endurance.

She attended Fort Salonga Elementary School, part of Kings Park Central School District. By the fourth grade, she was playing violin with the local high school orchestra. When DeVitto was 12 years old, she played a solo violin piece at Christie Brinkley and Peter Cook's wedding. She played in the Florida Symphony Youth Orchestra (1995–1997) and in the Florida Youth Artist Orchestra (1998–1999). She attended Youngsville Elementary School, part of Kings Park Central School District. She studied dance with the Kings Park Dance Center in New York and took acting classes at Zoe & Company in Orlando, Florida. After graduating from Winter Park High School in Winter Park, Florida, she spent her summer in Japan working as a model and had earlier spent time in Chicago.

Career

1990s 
DeVitto's modeling career started at age 15, when she began appearing in commercials, which she described to be a stepping stone to get to TV and film jobs. She was signed to Ford and Avenue One modeling agencies. Staying true to her love of music in 2002, she played violin with the Tommy Davidson Band at the Sunset Room in Hollywood. She also played violin on Raphael Saadiq's 2004 album, Ray Ray, as well as Stevie Nicks' 2011 album In Your Dreams.

2000s 
DeVitto landed her first acting role in 1999 when she participated in The WB drama series Safe Harbor. In 2000, she appeared in the Nickelodeon comedy series Noah Knows Best. In 2002, she landed a lead role in playwright Lee Blessing's play Eleemosynary, which was performed at the Orlando Shakespeare Theater. Her performance received praise and positive reviews in the Orlando Sentinel. DeVitto co-starred in the ABC Family drama series Beautiful People as aspiring model Karen Kerr from 2005 to 2006. DeVitto made her film debut in the dramatic short film Starcrossed (2005), which concerns two brothers who develop a sexual attraction to one another. She also appeared in the horror film sequel I'll Always Know What You Did Last Summer (2006) as Zoe Warner. She guest-starred on Drake & Josh, Scrubs, Jack & Bobby and had a small part in the romantic drama short film Forbidden Love. She had a lead role as an actress Sierra Young in the comedy film Heber Holiday (2007) and co-starred in the comedy-drama film Green Flash (2008) alongside David Charvet and Kristin Cavallari. DeVitto appeared in the horror comedy film Killer Movie (2008) with then-boyfriend Paul Wesley, Kaley Cuoco and Leighton Meester. From 2008 to 2009, DeVitto had a recurring role in the fifth and sixth seasons of The CW drama series One Tree Hill, where she played nanny Carrie. In 2013, DeVitto told Entertainment Tonight that her role as Carrie garnered strong reactions from the show's viewers and she often gets approached by fans about One Tree Hill.

2010s 
DeVitto appeared in Will.I.Am's Vote Obama video "We Are The Ones" (2008) and Stevie Nicks' music video for the song "Moonlight" (2011). In 2010, DeVitto began a recurring role as Melissa Hastings in the ABC Family mystery drama series Pretty Little Liars based on Sara Shepard's book series of the same name. In 2017, Samantha Simon of InStyle wrote that "for Torrey DeVitto, playing super-sketchy Melissa Hastings on Pretty Little Liars wasn't exactly a challenge. Because, despite the seemingly endless web of lies surrounding the eldest Hastings sister on the show, it all looks like child's play compared to DeVitto's other unforgettable role as psychotic Nanny Carrie on One Tree Hill." She played Nina in the horror film The Rite (2011) alongside Anthony Hopkins, Alice Braga and Colin O'Donoghue. It received favorable reviews from critics and grossed over $97 million at the worldwide box office.

In November 2011, DeVitto was confirmed to have a recurring role in The CW fantasy drama series The Vampire Diaries as Dr. Meredith Fell, who is fascinated by Alaric Saltzman (Matthew Davis), when she notices how quickly he recovers from an injury. She portrayed Margo in the comedy-drama film Cheesecake Casserole (2012), released on July 3, 2012. In November 2012, it was reported that she had signed on to star as Maggie Hall in the seventh season of the Lifetime drama series Army Wives. Maggie Hall is a mother of two and former soldier who moves to Fort Marshall with her family. On September 24, 2013, Lifetime announced the show's cancellation, it honored the show with a two-hour retrospective special with the cast members which aired in 2014. She had a lead role as Jennie Stanton in the Hallmark Channel television film Best Christmas Party Ever in 2014.In August 2015, DeVitto signed on to star in the NBC medical drama series Chicago Med. She was cast as Dr. Natalie Manning, the ED pediatrician. She has also appeared as Dr. Natalie Manning in Chicago P.D. and Chicago Fire. DeVitto's character exited the show after six years in the season 6 finale. "All good things must come to an end. It has been such an honor and pure joy to bring Dr. Natalie Manning to life for all of you on Chicago Med for the past 6 seasons. But it is now time for me and her to bow out and say goodbye," she wrote on Instagram.

She portrayed Angie in the psychological thriller The Hoaxing (2018), a short film that she also helped produce. In 2019, she started producing a documentary film, Saving Daisy that follows Daisy Coleman's journey of healing from lifelong trauma and PTSD. She starred in Hallmark Channel's television film Write Before Christmas (2019) alongside Chad Michael Murray. The film centers around Jessica, portrayed by DeVitto, who sends Christmas cards to five people who have impacted her life. The New York Times placed the film on its list of "Five Holiday Movies Worth Bingeing This Season".

2020s 
She played Cathy in the thriller film Divertimento (2020) alongside Kellan Lutz and Ola Rapace. The film won numerous awards, including "Best Ensemble" at the Seattle Film Festival in 2021. Shot in an 18th-century French castle, the film follows a chess player haunted by his tragic past, Jonas (Kellan Lutz), who is given an opportunity to participate in a mysterious game, Divertimento. Filmmaker Keyvan Sheikhalishahi wanted to create a film in which the six main characters each represent a chess piece.

On August 31, 2021, Deadline announced that DeVitto had joined the cast of Hallmark Movies & Mysteries film called The Christmas Promise alongside Dylan Bruce and Patrick Duffy. Production began in early September in Vancouver, Canada. In the film, DeVitto stars as Nicole, a woman dealing with grief with help from her grandfather and a carpenter she hires to help renovate her home. The film premiered on October 30, 2021, and aired again during Hallmark's popular countdown to Christmas. She played organic farmer Sarah in Hallmark Movies & Mysteries romantic time travel film, Rip in Time, which premiered on May 22, 2022.

Style and social media presence 
DeVitto's style has earned praise from periodicals such as Us Weekly. She was named one of Us Weekly's Most Stylish New Yorkers of 2018. DeVitto has been featured in several fashion blogs and magazines such as Cliché Magazine, Miami Living, Bello, CVLUX, Most Magazine, Crookes Magazine and Obscurae. She also modeled for TV Guide, That Magazine and Chicago Splash. She has frequently worn vegan fashion and her favorite vegan clothing is designed by Stella McCartney, Matt and Nat, Cri de Coeur, Bourgeois Boheme and Good Guys Don't Wear Leather.

DeVitto has developed an online and social media presence and endorses products such as beauty and wellness products on Instagram. She has partnered with several brands such as the FabFitFun beauty subscription box and Dickinson's Witch Hazel. She has used Instagram as a platform to raise awareness of current topics and her charitable causes such as sexual trafficking, hospices, racism and the Black Lives Matter movement. She encouraged her Instagram followers to vote in November 2022, writing: "Bans off our bodies! We do not vote for the sake of voting — we vote to elect leaders we can then hold accountable. Get out and VOTE this November to continue the fight to protect abortion rights!"

Philanthropy and activism 

DeVitto dedicates much of her time to philanthropy and notably supports various charities. She has been A Hospice Ambassador for the National Hospice and Palliative Care Organization since 2011. In 2013, she received National Hospice Foundation's Buchwald Spirit Award for Public Awareness. While filming for television series Chicago Med in Chicago, she works with Rainbow Hospice. DeVitto has been particularly involved in hospice care, saying "The notion that 'No one dies alone' was so beautiful to me and one I knew I needed to be a part of. There is no difference to me helping those coming into this world and those going out. It is equally important and should be treated as such. End of life care is something I will always be involved with."

She has also dedicated her time to organizations including IMAlive, Kindred Foundation for Adoption, Elton John AIDS Foundation, Maddie's Fund and The Humane Society. She designed a shirt to raise money for suicide prevention organization IMAlive, which hosts a live online crisis chat. She hosted a screening of the Hospice Foundation's first documentary, Okuyamba, at UCLA's James Bridges Theatre in 2012. DeVitto was part of the Hospice Foundation's documentary film crew that spent three and a half weeks of filming in Uganda, Kenya and South Sudan. She is the narrator of the documentary film titled Road to Hope (2015) that follows palliative care nurses in Uganda and the challenges they face in bringing comfort to those in the country's remote villages.

An animal rights advocate, DeVitto has two rescued dogs, Beau and Homie, and partnered with the Shelter Pet Project to promote adoption. In 2016, she teamed up with HSUS and their Be Cruelty-Free campaign. She declared herself "vegan in my fashion and vegetarian in my food".

In other charitable endeavors, she performed with Erik Nye at the New Horizons Havana Nights Gala in April 2015. DeVitto has worked alongside the National Alliance on Mental Illness to raise awareness for Mental Health Month in May. She also joined NAMI to share her own story and the importance of living stigma-free of mental illnesses. She is a member of the Rape, Abuse & Incest National Network's National Leadership Council (NLC), which is a group of dedicated individuals who are committed to RAINN's mission of supporting survivors and ending sexual violence. In August 2019, DeVitto announced that she became an official board member of SafeBae. In 2020, she teamed up with The Tote Project to launch a "Free to Blossom x Torrey DeVitto Pouch," made from recycled saris by sex trafficking victims in India. Glamour placed it on its list of "35 Eco-Friendly Gifts That Do Right by Mother Earth." A portion of each sale was donated to SafeBae, which works to prevent sexual assault among teens. On November 18, 2021, DeVitto visited South Kingstown High School as part of a tour of several schools in Rhode Island on behalf of SafeBae. She talked to students about the dangers of sexual assault and held a presentation about sexual assault prevention.

Personal life 
DeVitto began dating her Killer Movie co-star Paul Wesley in 2007, and they married in a private ceremony in April 2011. DeVitto and Wesley filed for divorce in July 2013 after two years of marriage, with their divorce finalized in December 2013. DeVitto was in a two-year relationship with comedian Rick Glassman from 2014 to 2016.  On May 8, 2021 she announced via Instagram that she was dating Chicago Cubs manager, David Ross. Per her March 8, 2023, guest appearance on “Unqualified with Anna Faris”, the two broke up recently.

She is good friends with actress Arielle Kebbel, who was also raised in Winter Park, Florida.

In May 2022, DeVitto revealed that she had an abortion at age 21, saying "I just started making money but with taxes and agent fees and manager fees, you don't really take home that much, and I didn't have the funds to do this. I was living in a house in Los Angeles with three other roommates and very scared, very confused, and so I made the decision that was best for me. And he made that decision as well".

Filmography

Film

Television

Music videos

Podcasts

Authored articles 

 DeVitto, Torrey (April 14, 2022). "A Reclamation: why we Need to Bring Back the Flower Power." Elephant Journal.

Awards and nominations

References

External links 

21st-century American actresses
21st-century American women musicians
21st-century American violinists
Actresses from Florida
Actresses from New York (state)
American female models
American film actresses
American people of Italian descent
American television actresses
Female models from Florida
Female models from New York (state)
Living people
Musicians from Florida
Musicians from New York (state)
People from Huntington, New York
People from Winter Park, Florida
Philanthropists from New York (state)
Winter Park High School alumni
Women violinists
1984 births